Jimmy Magill (31 December 1894 – 8 February 1942) was an amateur boxer and Royal Ulster Constabulary officer from Carncastle, near Larne in Northern Ireland.

Biography
Magill was the Amateur Boxing Association of England's middleweight champion in 1934 and 1935 and light heavyweight champion in 1936. He won fights in Boston and New York in an Irish tour of the US in 1935, was European Police champion from 1931 to 1936 and won a bronze medal representing Northern Ireland at the 1934 British Empire Games. As the Irish Amateur Boxing Association governed the sport in Northern Ireland, he was considered ineligible to compete for both Great Britain at the Olympics and Ireland at the Olympics. In 1936, Magill defeated Richard Vogt, who as a German Army Captain in 1940 saved the life of an Irish Guardsman wounded in the Dunkirk evacuation because they both knew Magill.

Magill was one of twelve children, and the youngest of seven brothers. His brother Davy Magill was the 1921 Royal Irish Constabulary heavyweight champion, and later in the 1920s was Irish professional champion at heavyweight and light heavyweight.

References

Further reading

External links
 

Commonwealth Games bronze medallists for Northern Ireland
Boxers at the 1934 British Empire Games
Male boxers from Northern Ireland
Sportspeople from County Antrim
Royal Ulster Constabulary officers
Middleweight boxers
Light-heavyweight boxers
1894 births
1942 deaths
People from Larne
Irish male boxers
Commonwealth Games medallists in boxing
Medallists at the 1934 British Empire Games